Mohammed Haydar Zammar ( Muḥammad Ḥaydar Zammār) (born 1961)  is a Syrian-German militant who served as an important al-Qaida recruiter, and is currently a member of the Islamic State. He claims to have recruited many of the organizers of the September 11, 2001, attacks. He was detained in Far'Falastin. A video believed to be taken in early 2014 places him listening to a speech by Abu Ali al-Anbari, the number two in the Islamic State, in Aleppo, Syria.

Early history
Zammar, a German citizen, was born in Syria.
At ten he moved to Germany with his family. Even among his very religiously conservative family, Mohammed Zammar impressed many with his extreme devotion at an early age. He became well known at many of the mosques in Hamburg, Germany. While still in high school, Zammar began to be associated with Jihadists through Mamoun Darkazanli, a fellow Syrian and al-Qaeda financier.

Zammar attended a metalworking college and planned to work for Mercedes-Benz. He worked as a translator in Saudi Arabia, and then took a job as a truck-driver back in Hamburg. But in 1991, he decided to make jihad his full-time job.

He flew to Afghanistan by way of Pakistan and underwent a training program for mujahideen fighters. His training included weapons knowledge, use of explosives, and advanced tactics. He performed well and was moved to an elite training camp near Jalalabad. By the end of the year, he had "graduated" and returned to Hamburg.

Zammar travelled extensively over the next few years. While working as a mechanic, he took long trips to Syria, Jordan, Turkey, and Sweden. In 1995, he traveled to Bosnia to fight there. And in 1996, Zammar visited Afghanistan for a second time, this time to become a formal member of the group called al-Qaeda. He was reported to have been personally invited by Osama bin Laden.

An al-Qaida recruiter
When Zammar returned to Hamburg he became a well known preacher among the Islamic community.
Der Spiegel described him, in 2002, as an imposing figure, who frequently gave enthusiastic speeches on behalf of bin Laden and other Islamists.
German police began to formally investigate him at this time, long before al-Qaeda's attacks on 9-11. Zammar made frequent short trips to Afghanistan throughout this period.

Mohamed Atta, a very conservative Muslim, became friends with Zammar around 1998. Zammar has reportedly boasted that he personally recruited Atta and other hijackers into al-Qaida, although this has not been confirmed. Zammar also met frequently with Mounir El Motassadeq around this time.

In 1998 Germany intensified their surveillance of Zammar. He was occasionally trailed, his phone was tapped, and all his calls were recorded. German authorities shared much of this information with the CIA, including Zammar's phone conversations with hijackers Marwan al-Shehhi, Mohamed Atta, Ramzi bin al-Shibh, and Said Bahaji.

Atta, Shehhi, and bin al-Shibh formed the Hamburg cell in November 1998, and Zammar is reported to have been a frequent visitor. Atta became respected as the group's leader, and Zammar was seen more as a valuable conduit for international contacts. Zammar may not have been aware of plans for an attack within the United States.

In the Summer of 1999, U.S. intelligence discovered that Zammar was in direct contact with one of bin Laden's senior operational coordinators. The U.S. apparently did not share this information with German intelligence. Zammar is also known to have met frequently with Said Bahaji in Germany in 2000.

Capture

On October 27, 2001, Zammar traveled to Morocco. Not long afterwards, he was arrested by Moroccan police with the assistance of the U.S. Although he was a German citizen and under investigation by Germany, German intelligence only learned about the arrest from the newspapers in June 2002.

Instead of being deported to the U.S. or Germany, Zammar was secretly sent to Syria for indefinite detention in the notorious Far'Falastin detention center in Damascus. Time Magazine reported: "U.S. officials in Damascus submit written questions to the Syrians, who relay Zammar's answers back. . . State Department officials like the arrangement because it insulates the U.S. government from any torture the Syrians may be applying to Zammar."

On December 15, 2005, it was officially confirmed that German Bundeskriminalamt federal police officers had on at least one occasion participated in Zammar's interrogation in Syria; it was claimed that these officers were unaware of the conditions at the prison. This seems doubtful given that it was widespread knowledge in the intelligence/international politics community, but if referring specifically to the treatment of Zammar, it may or may not be true; it is not known whether Zammar's interrogation by Syria or other parties did or does involve torture and if so, to which extent.

According to Amnesty International, Muhammad Haydar Zammar was a victim of the US-led renditions programme who was convicted in February 2007 after an unfair trial before the Syrian Supreme State Security Court. Amnesty also alleged that he was held in pre-trial detention for almost five years, much of it in incommunicado and solitary confinement, at the notorious Palestine Branch of Military Intelligence in Damascus. During his detention he was tortured and otherwise ill-treated. In June 2007 the UN Working Group on Arbitrary Detention stated that Muhammad Haydar Zammar was detained arbitrarily and called upon the Syrian authorities to "remedy the situation". Amnesty International was not aware of the authorities having taken any steps to do so.

Release
Zammar was released as part of a prisoner exchange between the Islamist Syrian rebel group Ahrar al-Sham and the Syrian Government in September 2013. A member of the negotiating team told Der Spiegel that days after being released, Zammar travelled to the Syrian city of Raqqa and joined the Islamic State of Iraq and the Levant (ISIL). He reportedly organised for funds to be sent to the Sinai-based militant group Ansar Bayt al-Maqdis, and negotiated for the group to swear allegiance to ISIL.

Recapture
Zammar was recaptured by members of the Kurdish People's Protection Units in March 2018 near the village of Darnij in Deir al-Zour. He is currently being held in a prison in Qamishli, Northern Syria, from where he gave an interview to the Washington Post in November 2018.

See also
Abu Hamza al-Masri
Khalid El-Masri
Imam Rapito affair

References

External links

The Kidnapping of Muhammad Al-Zammar - A Document Archive 

1961 births
Living people
Islamic terrorism in Germany
German al-Qaeda members
Syrian al-Qaeda members
Alleged al-Qaeda recruiters
German prisoners and detainees
Prisoners and detainees of Syria
People from Aleppo
People subject to extraordinary rendition by the United States
Far' Falastin prisoners
Syrian emigrants to Germany
Islamic State of Iraq and the Levant and Germany
Islamic State of Iraq and the Levant members from Germany
Hamburg cell